Oliver Berntzon (born 2 August 1993) is an international speedway rider from Sweden.

Speedway career 
Berntzon won the silver medal at the Swedish Championship in 2018. He qualified for the 2018 Speedway Grand Prix and the 2021 Speedway Grand Prix.

In 2022, he became the national champion of Sweden after winning the 2022 Swedish Individual Speedway Championship.

Major results

World individual Championship
2018 Speedway Grand Prix - 23rd (3 pts)
2019 Speedway Grand Prix - 19th (7 pts)
2021 Speedway Grand Prix - 15th (32 pts)
2022 Speedway Grand Prix - 23rd (5 pts)

References 

Living people
1993 births
Swedish speedway riders
People from Gislaved Municipality